Octave is a British unit of volume used for measuring whisky. It is approximately 16 gallons.

Conversion 

1 octave = 16 gallons 

1 octave = 0.073 m3

References

Units of volume
Customary units of measurement